Arthemus Ward "Art" Acord (April 17, 1890 – January 4, 1931) was an American silent film actor and rodeo champion. After his film career ended in 1929, Acord worked in rodeo road shows and as a miner in Mexico.

Early life and career

Acord was born to parents who were Utah pioneers and members of the Church of Jesus Christ of Latter-day Saints, Valentine Louis Acord and Mary Amelia Acord (née Pedersen), in the ranching area called Prattville, just west of the town of Glenwood, Utah. Art's father was of German and English descent.  The Acord family descends from a Prussian mercenary soldier of the American Revolutionary War whose name was Eckert. Art's paternal grandmother was a descendant of Frances Latham, an early settler of New England.  Art's mother, who was of Danish descent, died when Art was just 19 months old while the family was living in the Stillwater, Oklahoma area. The Acord family had moved there for the mother's health and took part in the September 28, 1891 Oklahoma Land Run. She died a few weeks later on November 28, 1891. After her death, the family moved back to Utah. As a young man, Acord worked as a cowboy, ranch hand and rodeo contestant. He worked on the ranch of Preston Nutter and was fond of riding horses of cliffs. In 1912, he won the World Steer Wrestling (Bulldogging) Championship at the Pendleton Round-up and won that same World Championship title again in 1916, defeating challenger and friend Hoot Gibson.

Acord was one of the few cowboys to have ridden the acclaimed bucking horse Steamboat (who later inspired the bucking horse logo on the Wyoming license plate) for the full eight seconds. His rodeo skills had been sharpened when he worked for a time for the Miller Brothers' traveling 101 Ranch Wild West Show. It was with the 101 that he became friends with Tom Mix, Yakima Canutt, Bee Ho Gray, "Broncho Billy" Anderson and Hoot Gibson. He was sometimes called the "Mormon cowboy".  He went on to become a noted actor in silent Western films. Acord also performed as a stunt man. He made over 100 film shorts, most of which are now considered lost.

Acord enlisted in the United States Army in World War I and served overseas. He was awarded the Croix de Guerre for bravery. At war's end, he returned to the motion picture business, appearing in a series of popular film shorts and as "Buck Parvin", the title character for a Universal Pictures serial. Because of a heavy drinking problem and his inability to adapt to the advent of talkies, Acord's film career declined and he ended up performing in road shows and mining in Mexico. In March 1928 Acord was seriously burned in an explosion at his home; the loss of his sight was feared.

Personal life
Acord was married three times. His first marriage was to actress Edythe Sterling in 1913. They divorced in 1916. In 1920, he married former actress Edna May Nores. Nores filed for divorce in April 1924 citing physical abuse and infidelity. The divorce was finalized the following year. His third marriage was to actress Louise Lorraine on April 14, 1926. The couple divorced in June 1928.

Death
On January 4, 1931, Acord died in a Chihuahua, Mexico hospital shortly after taking cyanide in a local hotel room. He was depressed and told the doctor who treated him shortly before he died that he had intentionally taken poison because he wanted to die. His body was sent back to California by train. He was given a military funeral with full honors and was buried in the Vale of Memory section in Forest Lawn Memorial Park Cemetery in Glendale, California.

For his contribution to the motion picture industry, Acord has a star on the Hollywood Walk of Fame at 1709 Vine Street.

Partial filmography

See also

 List of actors with Hollywood Walk of Fame motion picture stars

References

External links

 Art Acord in excerpt of The Squaw Man (1914)
 Art Acord in The Show Down (1921)

 Profile in the Encyclopedia of Oklahoma History and Culture
Art Acord, 1924 passport photo
Art Acord at Virtual History

1890 births
1931 suicides
20th-century American male actors
American expatriates in Mexico
Latter Day Saints from Utah
American male silent film actors
American stunt performers
United States Army personnel of World War I
American miners
Burials at Forest Lawn Memorial Park (Glendale)
Cowboys
Male film serial actors
Male actors from Utah
People from Glenwood, Utah
Recipients of the Croix de Guerre 1914–1918 (France)
Steer wrestlers
Suicides by poison
Suicides in Mexico
United States Army soldiers
Male Western (genre) film actors
American people of Prussian descent
American people of German descent
American people of English descent
American people of Danish descent
1931 deaths